Pararheinheimera texasensis is a Gram-negative, rod-shaped, non-spore-forming and motile bacterium from the genus of Pararheinheimera which has been isolated from the Spring Lake from San Marcos in the United States.

References 

Chromatiales
Bacteria described in 2007